The 1913 Copa del Rey Final (FEF) was the 13th final of the Spanish cup competition, the Copa del Rey. The final was played at Estadio O'Donnell in Madrid on 22 March 1913. The match ended in a 2–2 draw, after extra-time, forcing a replay that was played the next day, which saw Racing de Irún beat Athletic Bilbao 1-0, with a goal from Manuel Retegui.

Final details

|valign="top" width="50%"|

|}

Replay details

|valign="top" width="50%"|

|}

See also
1910 FEF Copa del Rey Final
1913 UECF Copa del Rey Final 
Basque football derbies

References

External links
linguasport.com
RSSSF.com

1913
FEF
Athletic Bilbao matches
Real Unión matches

ar:نهائي كأس ملك إسبانيا 1913